Norley is a civil parish in Cheshire West and Chester, England.  Other than the village of Norley, it is entirely rural.  The parish contains three buildings that are recorded in the National Heritage List for England as designated listed buildings.  These consist of a country house, a church, and a monument in the churchyard.

Key

Buildings

References
Citations

Sources

Listed buildings in Cheshire West and Chester
Lists of listed buildings in Cheshire